ArcelorMittal S.A. is a Luxembourgish-Spanish-French multinational steel manufacturing corporation headquartered in Luxembourg City. It was formed in 2006 from the takeover and merger of Arcelor by Indian-owned Mittal Steel. ArcelorMittal is the second largest steel producer in the world, with an annual crude steel production of 88 million metric tonnes . It is ranked 197th in the 2022 Fortune Global 500 ranking of the world's largest corporations. It employs directly and indirectly 200,000 people and its market capital is $25 billion. The total value of company assets is estimated to be around $100 billion.

Products and activities

The company is involved in research and development, mining, and steel. ArcelorMittal in 2016 produced around 90 million tons of steel. As of May 2017, the company made 200 unique steel grades for automotive purposes, half of which were introduced since 2007. Among the steel varieties are Usibor 2000, which the company announced in June 2016 and released later that year. Upon release, the high-strength automotive steel was said to be about one-third stronger than other steels then available for carmaking.

History

ArcelorMittal was formed from the acquisition of Arcelor by Mittal Steel; Mittal Steel was in turn formed from the merger of ISPAT International and LNM Holdings. The company traces its history back to 1976.

2006–2008: Formation and scalebacks
ArcelorMittal was created by the takeover of Western European steel maker Arcelor (Spain, France, and Luxembourg) by Indian-owned multinational steel maker Mittal Steel in 2006, at a cost of €40.37 per share, approximately $33 billion total. Mittal Steel launched a hostile takeover bid, which replaced a previously planned merger between Arcelor and Severstal that had lacked sufficient shareholder approval.

The resulting merged business was named ArcelorMittal and was headquartered in Luxembourg City. The resulting firm produced approximately 10% of the world's steel, and was by far the world's largest steel company. Total revenues in 2007 were $105 billion.

By February 2008, the company had 320,000 employees in 60 countries. In October 2008, the market capitalisation of ArcelorMittal was over $30 billion, after peaking at $32.5 billion in September 2008. At the end of 2008, the company reported operating income of around $12 billion.

In December 2008, ArcelorMittal announced several plant closings, including the Bethlehem Steel plant in Lackawanna, New York, and LTV Steel in Hennepin, Illinois.  After purchase of Kryvorizhstal, Ukraine's largest steel producer, employment was scaled back from 57,000 employees to 30,000.

2011–2014: Losses and Senegal agreement
In 2010, the company's operating income had fallen to $4.9 billion, with sales down 10 percent from the year earlier, and income down 50 percent as steel prices slumped. In 2011, the company began curtailing its European production to match the reduced demand for steel. It also sold Skyline Steel and Astralloy to a rival, Nucor, for $605 million. On 26 January 2011, the stainless steel division split off as a new company, Aperam.  , due to overcapacity and reduced demand in Europe, it had idled 9 of 25 blast furnaces; in October 2012 it permanently shut down two blast furnaces at Florange, France. On 31 October 2012, the company reported a third-quarter loss of $709 million as compared to a $659 million profit for the same period a year ago, citing the slow down in China's economy. In 2012 ArcelorMittal had $22 billion of debt.

In January 2013, ArcelorMittal bid $1.5 billion to acquire ThyssenKrupp AG's rolling mill in Calvert, Alabama, United States. On 26 February 2014, ThyssenKrupp sold their Calvert carbon steel facility to ArcelorMittal and Nippon Steel for $1.55 billion, as a new joint venture. The facility was renamed AM/NS Calvert through the 50/50 joint partnership with Nippon Steel & Sumitomo Metal Corp. The firm also entered into a $2.2 billion contract to develop an iron ore deposit in Senegal. This included construction of a  railway line.  After it stalled on the contract and failed to build according to schedule, the Government of Senegal sued. In September 2013, the government of Senegal won a court case before an international tribunal to rescind a $2.2 billion deal with ArcelorMittal after the company suspended work on an iron ore mine in the country. In June 2014, the International Chamber of Commerce's arbitration court in Paris awarded Senegal $150 million.

Dealing with price and demand fluctuations in the steel market, from 2012 to 2014 ArcelorMittal restructured its European division by reducing employee numbers and closing plants. In May 2014, ArcelorMittal, citing economic self-interest, declared its opposition to sanctions on Russia. As of June 2014, ArcelorMittal accounted for 7 percent of world steel production. After being shut out of the Chinese steel industry in 2005, along with other foreign companies, in 2014 the company announced it was planning new plants in China. In 2014, the company had an annual crude steel production of 98.1 million tons.

2008–2016: Price fixing convictions
Following an investigation first launched in 2008, in August 2016 the South African Competition Commission found the company guilty of price fixing.  ArcelorMittal was fined US$110.9 million and, as part of the settlement, also agreed to invest R4.64 billion in capital over five years. According to the findings, the firm had been part of a 17-member-steel group nicknamed "Club Zürich", that later became known as "Club Europe". Between January 1984 and September 2002, the companies fixed the market, prices, and exchanged confidential corporate information.

2015–2016: Recent acquisitions
In 2015, the company had a net loss of $7.9 billion. Between February 2015 and February 2016, share value dropped 60%, making the company the "worst performer" in the FTSEurofirst300 index. The CEO said the company had performed poorly in 2015 due to "Chinese exports depressing prices". Early in 2016, the company announced it had raised $3 billion in new investment capital to help reduce debt to $11.7 billion of debt. In early 2016 the company also announced a program to boost core profit by $3 billion by 2020 "through a mixture of cost-cutting, increased production and a focus on higher-value forms of steel". Chairman Lakshmi Mittal announced doubled earnings the following year in May 2017. Along with the increase in capital, the company also sold its 35% stake in Gestamp Automacion for $979 million, with the goal of reducing ArcelorMittal's debt to less than $12 billion. By February 2016, the company made about 6% of the world's steel. It ranked 108th in the 2016 Fortune Global 500 ranking of the world's biggest corporations.

2017: Market changes
In February 2017 ArcelorMittal announced its first annual profits in five years. In February 2017, ArcelorMittal and Votorantim announced plans to combine their long steel operations in Brazil. Under the deal, Votorantim Siderurgia became a subsidiary of ArcelorMittal Brasil. In late May 2017, ArcelorMittal and the Steel Authority of India Ltd (SAIL) agreed on preliminary terms to form a $913 million joint venture to export a fifth of the auto-grade steel made by the venture. In March 2017, the company proposed a new US$6.5 billion steel project in Karnataka, after entering into a pact with the Karnataka government in February 2017. In April 2017, Sanjeev Gupta's Liberty House Group announced it had agreed to acquire ArcelorMittal's Georgetown Steelworks in South Carolina. It is ranked 123 in the 2017 Fortune Global 500 ranking of the world's biggest corporations.

By March 2017, ArcelorMittal was leading a consortium bidding for Ilva. An Italian company, Ilva owns the Taranto steelworks in southern Italy, which has Europe's largest steel output. The steelworks had been accused of toxic emissions linked to local cancer rates, and had been nationalized by the government years prior. The buyers were the AM Investco consortium, which beyond ArcelorMittal included Marcegaglia and Banca Intesa Sanpaolo. In May 2017, ArcelorMittal was announced as the preferred bidder over a different consortium led by JSW Steel, after it was able to pledge a production increase and guarantee employment levels. The final decision was waiting on Italy's ministry of economic development. On 5 June 2017, ArcelorMittal won approval to purchase Ilva for €1.8 billion. In its bid, AM Investco had pledged to make investments into Ilva of €2.4bn until 2023. On 1 November 2018, ArcelorMittal assumed ownership of Ilva steel operations and ArcelorMittal Italia was formed.

In July 2017 the company reported a 19.3 per cent year-on-year rise in its earnings for the year's second quarter. The amount was lower than predicted by analysts, with the company citing the volatility in market prices. Also, in July 2017, the European Court of Justice ruled against ArcelorMittal in its lawsuit against how the EU allocates free carbon permits.

2018: Black snow controversy 

In January 2018, black snow fell in the city of Temirtau, Kazakhstan where an ArcelorMittal plant is located. Local citizens complained that the pollution was caused by an ArcelorMittal plant. A spokesperson for ArcelorMittal explained that the discoloration of the snow was caused by a lack of wind which would otherwise blow the pollution away.

2019: Notice to terminate to Ilva 
On 4 November 2019, Arcelor Mittal (Am Investco Italy) sent to Ilva's Commissioners a notice to terminate, the Ilva lease agreement, citing as reasons that the Italian Parliament had removed the legal protection necessary for the company to implement its environmental plan without the risk of criminal liability and that a recent decision by the criminal court of Taranto would effectively force Mittal to close blast furnace #2 by 13 December 2019. A legal and media battle with the Italian state started immediately, as Ilva is not only the single primary steel mill Mittal operates in Italy but also the largest employer in Taranto.

2020: Sale of U.S. Operations to Cleveland-Cliffs 
On September 28, 2020, the company sold its US-Business to Cleveland-Cliffs for approximately $1.4 billion.

Company structure 
Lakshmi Mittal (owner of Mittal Steel) is the executive chairman. His family owns 40% of the shares and voting shares in the company. After a $3 billion rights issue earlier in April 2016, the company by 21 April 2016 had a share value of 16,616 million euros, distributed in 3,065,710,869 shares.

Predecessor companies
Acquired by Mittal Steel Company:
International Steel Group (acquired 2004)
Bethlehem Steel - United States (acquired 2003)
ISG Weirton Steel - United States (acquired 2002)
LTV-Steel Cleveland, OH - United States (acquired 2002)
Republic Steel - United States (acquired 1984)
Jones and Laughlin Steel - United States (acquired 1984)
Acme Steel - Chicago, US (acquired 2002)
Ispat International (acquired 2004)
ArcelorMittal Kryvyi Rih - Ukraine (acquired 2005)

Acquired by Arcelor:
Aceralia - Spain (merger 2001)
Usinor - France (merger 2001)
Acesita - Brazil (acquired 1998)
ARBED - Luxembourg (merger 2001)
Acindar - Argentina (acquired 2006)
Dofasco - Canada (acquired 2006)

Board of directors
Comprised as follows by nine people as of June 2017:
Aditya Mittal, CEO and Founder of ArcelorMittal (Chairman of the Board)
Bruno Lafont, Co-chairman and former CEO of LafargeHolcim
Tye Burt, former CEO and President of Kinross Gold
Jeannot Krecké, Member of Parliament for Luxembourg and former Minister for the Economy and Foreign Trade of Luxembourg
Suzanne Nimocks, former Director for Energy at McKinsey & Company
Karel De Gucht, former European Commissioner for Trade and Belgian Foreign Minister
Michel Wurth, former CFO of ARBED
Karyn Ovelmen, CFO of Flowserve

Employees 
As of 2012, the company had thousands of workers at 12 major facilities in the United States, in states such as Indiana, Ohio and Pennsylvania. All non-salary employees in North America, with the exception of the Dofasco facility in Hamilton, Ontario, are represented by the United Steelworkers union, the largest industrial union in North America. Also, at the time around 100,000 of the company's 260,000 employees were in Europe. As of 31 December 2013, the company employed over 232,000 people, of which 37% were in the EU, with a further 16% in non-EU European countries, 17% in Asia, 16% in North America, the remainder split between South America and the Middle East and Africa. ArcelorMittal is also Luxembourg's largest private employer. At the beginning of 2014, it employed 4,600 employees in the Grand Duchy. By 2020 the company had over 18,000 employees in North and South America.

Facilities

Headquarters and offices

The head office of ArcelorMittal is in Luxembourg City. The building was the head office of Arbed before that company merged with Aceralia and Usinor.

Major plant locations

Operated by ArcelorMittal:
 Timóteo Plant - Minas Gerais, Brazil (through Aperam South America)
 ArcelorMittal Ghent - Zelzate, Belgium
 Kryvorizhstal - Kryvyi Rih, Ukraine (through ArcelorMittal Kryvyi Rih)
 Plants in Aktau, Temirtau, Kazakhstan
 Plants in Ostrava, Czech Republic
 ArcelorMittal Mexico - Lázaro Cárdenas, Michoacán, Mexico
 Katowice Steelworks - Dąbrowa Górnicza, Poland
 Tadeusz Sendzimir Steelworks - Kraków, Poland
 Hunedoara steel works - Hunedoara, Romania
 Galați steel works - Galaţi, Romania (now operated by Liberty Galati)
 El Hadjar Complex - El Hadjar, Algeria
 Dofasco - Hamilton, Ontario, Canada
 Acindar - Villa Constitución, Argentina, Argentina
 Ilva steelworks - Taranto, Italy
 Hibbing Taconite - Hibbing, United States
 Vanderbijlpark, South Africa

Joint ventures:
 AM/NS India - Hazira (joint venture with Nippon Steel)
 Annaba steel complex - Anaba, Algeria (joint venture with Sidar)
Ouenza and Boukhadra mines - Algeria (joint venture with Sidar)
I/N Kote - New Carlisle, United States (built 1991, joint venture with Nippon Steel)
AM/NS Calvert - Calvert, United States (50/50 joint partnership with Nippon Steel)
 ArcelorMittal Aços Longos -  Brazil (also owned by Belgo-Mineira)

Carbon footprint
ArcelorMittal reported Total CO2e emissions (Direct + Indirect) for 31 December 2020 at 150.8 Tg (teragram) (-31,100 /-17.1% y-o-y). The decline accelerated compared to the CAGR of -7.2% since 4Q'18.

See also 
 List of steel producers
 Steel industry in Luxembourg
 ArcelorMittal Orbit (building sponsored by chairman)
 Economy of Belo Horizonte

References

External links
 

 

 
Multinational companies headquartered in Luxembourg
Companies based in Luxembourg City
Manufacturing companies established in 2006
Non-renewable resource companies established in 2006
CAC 40
IBEX 35
Companies listed on Euronext Paris
Mittal family
Luxembourgian companies established in 2006